The Divine Gift is a 1918 British silent drama film directed by Thomas Bentley and starring Joyce Dearsley, Ernest Hendrie and Henrietta Watson. It was made at Bushey Studios.

Cast
 Joyce Dearsley as The Shopgirl
 Ernest Hendrie as The Professor
 Henrietta Watson as The Hostess
 Madge Saunders as The Mother
 Muriel Dole as Katharine
 F. Pope-Stamper as Tristan
 Wanda Redford as Iseult
 Micheline Poteus as Prehistoric Woman

Bibliography
 Low, Rachael. History of the British Film, 1914-1918. Routledge, 2005.

External links

1918 films
1918 drama films
British drama films
1910s English-language films
Films directed by Thomas Bentley
British silent feature films
British black-and-white films
1910s British films
Silent drama films